Tibersyrnola is a genus of sea snails, marine gastropod mollusks in the family Pyramidellidae, the pyrams and their allies.

Species
Species within the genus Tibersyrnola include:
 Tibersyrnola bacillum (Pilsbry, 1901)
 Tibersyrnola cinnamomea (A. Adams, 1863)
 Tibersyrnola guzzettii Bozzetti, 2007
 † Tibersyrnola inexpectata Laws, 1937 
 Tibersyrnola lawsi (Powell, 1934) †
 Tibersyrnola lepidula (Habe, 1961)
 † Tibersyrnola pupaformis Grant-Mackie & Chapman-Smith 1971 
 † Tibersyrnola semiconcava (P. Marshall & R. Murdoch, 1923) 
 Tibersyrnola serotina (A. Adams, 1863)
 † Tibersyrnola tepikiensis (Powell, 1934) 
 Tibersyrnola unifasciata'' (Forbes, 1844)

References

External links
 To World Register of Marine Species

Pyramidellidae